Copelatus posticatus is a species of diving beetle. It is part of the subfamily Copelatinae in the family Dytiscidae. It was described by Fabricius in 1801.

References

External links

Copelatus posticatus at insectoid.info

posticatus
Beetles described in 1801
Taxa named by Johan Christian Fabricius